The Volkswagen Type 3 is a compact car manufactured and marketed by Volkswagen from 1961 to 1973. Introduced at the 1961 Frankfurt Motor Show, Internationale Automobil-Ausstellung (IAA), the Type 3 was marketed as the Volkswagen 1500 and later as the Volkswagen 1600, in three body styles: two-door Notchback, Fastback, and Station Wagon, the latter marketed as the 'Squareback' in the United States.

The Type 3 diversified Volkswagen's product range beyond the existing models—the Type 1 Beetles, Type 14 Karmann Ghia, Type 2 vans and pickups—while retaining Volkswagen's hallmark engineering features: the air-cooled rear-engine, rear-wheel drive train, body-on-chassis construction with a backbone chassis integrated into the car's floorpan), as well as torsion bar front and rear suspension. 

Despite using the Beetle's  wheelbase, the Type 3 was conceived as a larger car, offering a larger engine and increased cargo and passenger volume—the latter from its increased length and width as well as from its slab-sided, Ponton styling, maximizing the platform's footprint.

Background
The Type 3 emulated major features of the Type 1 Beetle, using a low-profile version of Volkswagen's rear-engined, 4-cylinder air-cooled engine, as well as body-on-chassis construction (the body bolts to a frame that includes the floor pan), retaining the same wheelbase – but using more contemporary and slab-sided Ponton styling, in contrast to the Type 1's articulated fenders and running boards. VW finalized the design by 1959 with prototypes ready for testing by 1960. Secrecy was such that even at the 1960 Geneva Auto Show, VW denied they were readying a new design. In 1961 VW announced the new line as the "VW 1500".

Production began in August 1961, a month before launch, of the Volkswagen 1500 Notchback, encompassing three-box styling in a notchback saloon body. Production of the Karmann Ghia 1500 (also known as the Type 34 Karmann Ghia) with a coupé body commenced in November 1961 and deliveries started in January 1962. The station wagon/estate-bodied Variant (marketed as the Squareback in the US) followed, with the first cars produced in February 1962. Two convertibles based on the 1500 Notchback were also announced with the original models, but did not enter production.

The Fastback, or TL version, a fastback coupé, arrived in August 1965, along with the 1600 engine. Volkswagen's intention was that this model should replace the Notchback, which is what happened in the UK market. However, in other markets, including the German domestic market, the number of customers preferring the older Notchback shaped car was higher than foreseen, and in the end both Notchback and Fastback remained in production until July 1973. The Type 3 also featured full carpeting, and was ultimately available with an automatic transmission and air conditioning, the latter in the US.

Volkswagen of America began marketing the Type 3 in 1966, in "Squareback" and "Fastback" configuraitons, but not the Notchback. The Type 3 was competing in the market with the Chevrolet Corvair that had been previously introduced in the United States in 1960, which incorporated a 6-cylinder rear-mounted air-cooled engine in notchback and station wagon body style, as well as a compact van derived from the platform. It also competed in the US with the Renault 8 which also offered a rear engine and rear drive sedan.

In 1968, the Type 3 'E' (Einspritzung) became the first German automobile in series production with electronic fuel injection (Bosch D-Jetronic) as standard equipment. 

For the 1968 model year, 1969 in the US, a three-speed fully automatic transaxle became available, noted for extremely low internal friction. With the automatic came CV-jointed independent rear suspension (IRS), replacing the swing axle (also IRS) set-up. For 1969, the CV-jointed rear axle was standard with both automatic and manual transmissions.

Type 3 models received a facelift in 1970, with a revised front end, its nose extended by  adding  to the luggage capacity. At the same time Type 3s received revised square-section bumpers with integral rub strips, as well as larger tail lamps and front indicators.

Volkswagen offered the Type 3 in a lower trim level in Europe, marketed as the 1600A trim level. In the US, and for 1973 only, Volkswagen of America offered two trim levels of the Type 3 Fastback in the US, marketed as the Type 3 Sedan and Type 3 Basic Compact. The Basic Compact trim level featured reduced content, including limited color and upholstery availability; deletion of exterior belt line chrome trim, clock, and electric-heated rear window defogger—and using painted vent widow frames, a black cardboard front trunk liner over the gas tank without a liner on the sides of the trunk or over the firewall, and plain vinyl door panels without door pockets and rubber mats in lieu of interior carpet.

While the Type 3 was a more modern design, it never reached the same level of popularity as the Beetle. As Volkswagen started to produce front-wheel-drive water-cooled designs, production ended in 1973 at the Wolfsburg plant. The Wolfsburg production facilities were then retooled to build the Golf, which eventually replaced the Type 1 as Volkswagen's best selling sedan. Production of the Type 3 moved to VW's new Emden plant, which was retooled later in 1973 to build the first generation Passat (marketed variously, also as the "Dasher").

Engine and drivetrain

The Type 3 was initially equipped with a 1.5 L (1493 cc) engine based on the air-cooled 1192 cc flat-4 found in the Type 1, but given a 69 mm stroke it became the basis for the 1300 cc and 1600 cc engines that followed in the later Beetle (Type 1) and Volkswagen Type 2 T1 and T2. While the long block remained the same as the Type 1, the engine cooling was redesigned by putting the fan on the end of the crankshaft instead of on the generator. This reduced the height of the engine profile, allowing greater cargo volume and earning its nicknames: the pancake or suitcase engine. The engine's displacement would eventually increase to 1.6 L (1584 cc).

The Type 3 used a similar transmission to the Beetle but with higher ratios (4.125 R&P v 4.375 R&P) and longer axles. Unlike the Beetle (Type 1), the Type 3 engine and transmission unit was mounted into a subframe (which contained the complete rear suspension), in turn rubber-mounted to the floorpan and body, thereby isolating vibration and road noise from the passenger space.

The original Volkswagen 1500 used a single side-draught 32 mm Solex PHN carburetor.

The Type 3 engine received a larger displacement (1.6 L) for 1966 (August '65) and in 1968 became the world's first volume production car to feature electronic fuel injection – pioneered by Bosch. The Bosch D-Jetronic system was offered on the Volkswagen 1600 TE & LE version (E designating "Einspritzung" or "injection" in German). A similar Bosch injection system was used in the later Type 4 VW 411, some models of the Porsche 914, Opel Admiral, Diplomat and Commodore, and available for the Volvo 1800E/ES, 142E, and certain 1972–75 140 and 164 series cars (see Volvo P1800)as well as certain Citroen DS21. Also introduced for 1968 was a fully automatic transmission.

A notable advance from the Type 1 to the Type 3 was the front suspension—although similar to the Type 1, it was the first Volkswagen front suspension to incorporate transverse round torsion bars, as opposed to the Type 1's torsion leaves. The Type 3's torsion bars are cross-mounted in the lower tube, so that each individual torsion bar spans the full width of the car, the upper tube containing an anti-roll bar that connects the upper trailing links to each other. The complete front suspension unit is rubber-mounted to the car's floorpan. In 1968 the rear suspension was upgraded to double jointed CV joint semi trailing arm suspension (sometimes called "IRS" by VW enthusiasts to differentiate it from the previous IRS swing-axle type), a design feature that previously appeared on the VW Type 2 in 1967.

The Type 3 offered both front and rear enclosed luggage areas, with cargo accessibile via both the boot (trunk) and the bonnet (hood). In each of the 3 variants (Notchback, Squareback, and Fastback) as well as the Type 2's from 1973 on, the engine was located under and accessed by a panel in the rear trunk.

This engine placement was highlighted in a period Volkswagen television commercial for the American market. It featured a very young actor Dustin Hoffman showing the interior of the Fastback model and explaining the car's technical features but unable to locate the engine. The ad closed with the copy, "Your VW dealer will show you where the motor is."

The original Type 3 with 5-stud wheels (5 × 205 mm PCD) used twin leading shoe drum brakes at the front. In August '65 (the '66 model year) these were replaced by disc brakes, coinciding with the introduction of the Fastback and 1600 engine (Australian-built models retained drum front brakes until August 1967). These have 4-stud wheels (4 × 130 mm PCD) with 8 cooling slots. Rear brakes were always leading / trailing shoe drums.

Technical data

Production figures
German production:

Type 31 1500/1600 Notchback/Fastback: 1,339,124
Type 36 1500/1600 Variant: 1,202,935
Type 351 1500/1600 Convertible (prototypes): 12
1500/1600 chassis and works prototypes: 311

Brazilian production:

Notchback: 24,475
Fastback: 109,515
Variant: 256,760
Variant II: 41,002

Australian production
The Type 3 was manufactured at Clayton in Victoria, Australia, from 1963 in sedan, station wagon and sedan delivery body styles. In 1965, the fastback was introduced, fully imported from Germany.

Panel van versions (based on the 1500 'N') feature a marine ply wood loading area with zinc plated steel protector strips, one sun visor (for the driver), a clock delete panel, and no side windows. All Australian-assembled panel vans were fitted with a metal ID tag behind the spare wheel with a prefix of PV, followed by the number, stamped by hand. There are approximately 10 known surviving panel vans from the estimated original production run of 500 and a further 10 to 15 from German manufacture.

Following the cessation of all local manufacturing by Volkswagen Australasia in 1968, the Type 3 was assembled from CKD kits by Motor Producers Limited at the same Clayton facility through to 1973.

Related models

Type 34 Karmann Ghia

In 1961, Volkswagen introduced the VW 1500 Karmann Ghia, or Type 34, based on its new Type 3 platform, featuring Volkswagen's new flat 1500 cc engine design, and styling by Italian engineer Sergio Sartorelli at Carrozzeria Ghia. 

Until it was replaced by the VW-Porsche 914, it was the most expensive, and most luxurious passenger car VW manufactured in the 1960s. 42,505 (plus 17 prototype convertibles) were manufactured from 1962–1969.

Although the Type 34 was available in most countries, it was not offered officially in the U.S., VW's largest and most important export market.

Brazilian Type 3
The three-box Type 3 was launched in Brazil in 1968 with unique styling (similar to the Brasilia) penned by Marcio Piancastelli, and four doors. It met with little success, nicknamed Zé do Caixão (meaning "Coffin Joe", after a popular Brazilian horror movie maker) for its boxy shape. It was discontinued in 1970.

The fastback version, the Volkswagen TL, fared somewhat better, remaining in production from 1970 to 1976, originally as a two-door and later as a four-door version.

As in Germany, the original Karmann Ghia was replaced with the Type 3-based Karmann Ghia TC (Touring Coupé), but with a distinct look from the German Karmann Ghia Type 34.

Neither enjoyed as much success as its estate-bodied sibling, the Variant. The 3-door Variant was produced from 1969 to 1977, followed by an updated successor with squarer body, the Variant II, which was produced from 1977 to 1981.

Brazilian Type 3s used the front suspension from the Type 1 with its laminated half-width torsion bars in top and bottom tubes and solidly mounted to the floorpan, unlike the German Type 3's rubber mounted unit with full-width crossed round bars in the lower tube and anti-roll bar in the top one. The only exception among the Brazilian Type 3s was the Variant II, which was equipped with a front MacPherson strut.

Argentinian Dodge 1500-based Volkswagen 1500

A "Volkswagen 1500" unrelated to the Type 3 model 1500 was sold during the 1980s in Argentina based upon the Dodge 1500 manufactured in that country.

In 1980, Volkswagen bought the Argentinian company Chrysler Fevre Argentina SAIC, inheriting some Dodge / Chrysler models and renaming the company Volkswagen Argentina SA. One of the models was the Dodge 1500 (also the Dodge 1800) which the newly taken-over company re-badged as Volkswagen 1500 for the Argentinian market. The estate was known as the Volkswagen 1500 Rural. Both variants continued to be sold until 1988.

The car, which was based on the Hillman Avenger, had also been sold in Brazil, where it was known as the Dodge Polara. This version ceased in 1981, shortly after Volkswagen's purchase of the tooling in Argentina. The same car was available earlier in the 1970s in North America as the Plymouth Cricket.

No parts of the Dodge 1500/"Volkswagen 1500" overlap with the Volkswagen Type 3 model 1500, or any other Volkswagen product.

References

External links

Unique Cars and Parts (Australia) Volkswagen Type 3
Type 3 Registry for Volkswagen Type 3 Vehicles (1961-1973)
Type 3 Wiki for Volkswagen Type 3 Vehicles (1961-1973)

Cars of Brazil
Rear-engined vehicles
Type 3
Cars powered by boxer engines
Cars introduced in 1961
Compact cars
Sedans
Station wagons
1970s cars
Rear-wheel-drive vehicles
Coupés